Logan Douglas Davidson (born December 26, 1997) is an American professional baseball shortstop in the Oakland Athletics organization. He played college baseball at Clemson University before the Athletics selected him in the first round of the 2019 Major League Baseball draft.

Amateur career
Davidson attended Providence High School in Charlotte, North Carolina. In 2016, The Charlotte Observer named him their high school baseball player of the year. He enrolled at Clemson University, where he played college baseball for the Clemson Tigers. In 2017 and 2018, he played collegiate summer baseball with the Falmouth Commodores of the Cape Cod Baseball League.

Professional career
The Oakland Athletics selected Davidson in the first round, with the 29th overall selection, of the 2019 Major League Baseball draft. 

After Davidson signed with Oakland, he was assigned to the Vermont Lake Monsters of the Class A-Short Season New York-Penn League. Over 54 games, he batted .239 with four home runs and 12 RBIs. Oakland invited Davidson to spring training as a non-roster player in 2020, but he did not play a minor league game due to the cancellation of the season. He was assigned to the Midland RockHounds of the Double-A Central in 2021, slashing .212/.307/.313 with seven home runs and 48 RBIs over 119 games. After the 2021 regular season, he earned a spot playing for the Mesa Solar Sox in the Arizona Fall League.

The Athletics invited Davidson to spring training as a non-roster player in 2022. He returned to Midland for the 2022 season.

Personal life
Davidson's father, Mark Davidson, played in MLB. His sister, Taylor, played tennis for Stanford University.

References

External links

1997 births
Living people
People from Charlotte, North Carolina
Clemson Tigers baseball players
Falmouth Commodores players
Baseball shortstops
Baseball players from North Carolina
Vermont Lake Monsters players
Midland RockHounds players